Darren Gardner (born May 14, 1990) is a Canadian snowboarder, competing in the discipline of parallel giant slalom.

Career

2018 Winter Olympics
In January 2018, Gardner was named to Canada's 2018 Olympic team.

References

1990 births
Living people
Canadian male snowboarders
Sportspeople from Burlington, Ontario
Snowboarders at the 2018 Winter Olympics
Olympic snowboarders of Canada
Competitors at the 2015 Winter Universiade